The metric system is a system of measurement that succeeded the decimalised system based on the metre that had been introduced in France in the 1790s. The historical development of these systems culminated in the definition of the International System of Units (SI) in the mid-20th century, under the oversight of an international standards body. Adopting the metric system is known as metrication. 

The historical evolution of metric systems has resulted in the recognition of several principles. Each of the fundamental dimensions of nature is expressed by a single base unit of measure. The definition of base units has increasingly been realised from natural principles, rather than by copies of physical artefacts. For quantities derived from the fundamental base units of the system, units derived from the base units are used—e.g., the square metre is the derived unit for area, a quantity derived from length. These derived units are coherent, which means that they involve only products of powers of the base units, without empirical factors. For any given quantity whose unit has a special name and symbol, an extended set of smaller and larger units is defined that are related by factors of powers of ten. The unit of time should be the second; the unit of length should be either the metre or a decimal multiple of it; and the unit of mass should be the gram or a decimal multiple of it.

Metric systems have evolved since the 1790s, as science and technology have evolved, in providing a single universal measuring system. Before and in addition to the SI, some other examples of metric systems are the following: the MKS system of units and the MKSA systems, which are the direct forerunners of the SI; the centimetre–gram–second (CGS) system and its subtypes, the CGS electrostatic (cgs-esu) system, the CGS electromagnetic (cgs-emu) system, and their still-popular blend, the Gaussian system; the metre–tonne–second (MTS) system; and the gravitational metric systems, which can be based on either the metre or the centimetre, and either the gram(-force) or the kilogram(-force).

The SI has been adopted as the official system of weights and measures by nearly all nations in the world.

Background 

The French Revolution (1789–99) provided an opportunity for the French to reform their unwieldy and archaic system of many local weights and measures. Charles Maurice de Talleyrand championed a new system based on natural units, proposing to the French National Assembly in 1790 that such a system be developed. Talleyrand had ambitions that a new natural and standardised system would be embraced worldwide, and was keen to involve other countries in its development. Great Britain ignored invitations to co-operate, so the French Academy of Sciences decided in 1791 to go it alone and they set up a commission for the purpose. The commission decided that the standard of length should be based on the size of the Earth. They defined that length to be the 'metre' and its length as one ten-millionth of the length of an Earth quadrant, the length of the meridian arc on the Earth's surface from the equator to the north pole. In 1799, after the arc measurement had been surveyed, the new system was launched in France.

The units of the metric system, originally taken from observable features of nature, are now defined by seven physical constants being given exact numerical values in terms of the units.  In the modern form of the International System of Units (SI), the seven base units are: metre for length, kilogram for mass, second for time, ampere for electric current, kelvin for temperature, candela for luminous intensity and mole for amount of substance. These, together with their derived units, can measure any physical quantity.  Derived units may have their own unit name, such as the watt (J/s) and lux (cd/m2), or may just be expressed as combinations of base units, such as velocity (m/s) and acceleration (m/s2).

The metric system was designed to have properties that make it easy to use and widely applicable, including units based on the natural world, decimal ratios, prefixes for multiples and sub-multiples, and a structure of base and derived units.  It is also a coherent system, which means that its units do not introduce conversion factors not already present in equations relating quantities.  It has a property called rationalisation that eliminates certain constants of proportionality in equations of physics.

The metric system is extensible, and new derived units are defined as needed in fields such as radiology and chemistry.  For example, the katal, a derived unit for catalytic activity equivalent to one mole per second (1 mol/s), was added in 1999.

Principles 
Although the metric system has changed and developed since its inception, its basic concepts have hardly changed. Designed for transnational use, it consisted of a basic set of units of measurement, now known as base units. Derived units were built up from the base units using logical rather than empirical relationships while multiples and submultiples of both base and derived units were decimal-based and identified by a standard set of prefixes.

Realisation

The base units used in a measurement system must be realisable. Each of the definitions of the base units in the SI is accompanied by a defined mise en pratique [practical realisation] that describes in detail at least one way in which the base unit can be measured. Where possible, definitions of the base units were developed so that any laboratory equipped with proper instruments would be able to realise a standard without reliance on an artefact held by another country.  In practice, such realisation is done under the auspices of a mutual acceptance arrangement.

In the SI, the standard metre is defined as exactly  of the distance that light travels in a second. The realisation of the metre depends in turn on precise realisation of the second. There are both astronomical observation methods and laboratory measurement methods that are used to realise units of the standard metre. Because the speed of light is now exactly defined in terms of the metre, more precise measurement of the speed of light does not result in a more accurate figure for its velocity in standard units, but rather a more accurate definition of the metre.

The kilogram was originally defined as the mass of one cubic decimetre of water at 4 °C, standardized as the mass of a man-made artefact of platinum–iridium held in a laboratory in France, which was used until a new definition was introduced in May 2019. Replicas made in 1879 at the time of the artefact's fabrication and distributed to signatories of the Metre Convention serve as de facto standards of mass in those countries. Additional replicas have been fabricated since as additional countries have joined the convention. The replicas were subject to periodic validation by comparison to the original, called the IPK. The accepted redefinition of SI base units replaced the IPK with an exact definition of the Planck constant as expressed in SI units, which defines the kilogram in terms of fundamental constants.

Base and derived unit structure

The metric system base units were originally adopted because they represented fundamental orthogonal dimensions of measurement corresponding to how we perceive nature: a spatial dimension, a time dimension, one for inertia, and later, a more subtle one for the dimension of an "invisible substance" known as electricity or more generally, electromagnetism. One and only one unit in each of these dimensions was defined, unlike older systems where multiple perceptual quantities with the same dimension were prevalent, like inches, feet and yards or ounces, pounds and tons. Units for other quantities like area and volume, which are also spatial dimensional quantities, were derived from the fundamental ones by logical relationships, so that a unit of square area for example, was the unit of length squared.

Many derived units were already in use before and during the time the metric system evolved, because they represented convenient abstractions of whatever base units were defined for the system, especially in the sciences. So analogous units were scaled in terms of the units of the newly established metric system, and their names adopted into the system. Many of these were associated with electromagnetism.  Other perceptual units, like volume, which were not defined in terms of base units, were incorporated into the system with definitions in the metric base units, so that the system remained simple. It grew in number of units, but the system retained a uniform structure.

Decimal ratios 
Some customary systems of weights and measures have duodecimal (base-12) ratios, which means quantities are divisible by 2, 3, 4, and 6. The temporal system of hour–minute–second has sexagesimal (base-60) ratios, which is divisible by an extra integer of 5 in addition to the divisors of 2, 3, 4, and 6 of the duodecimal ratios, which is actually also the half-day–hour ratio.

However, these systems of measures rarely stick to one constant ratio. As mentioned above, the ratio of a day to an hour is 24, unequal to the hour-to-minute or the minute-to-second ratio of 60. Similarly, the foot-to-inch ratio is 12, which is fourfold of the yard-to-foot ratio. A stone is 14 pounds but a pound is 16 ounces.

Even though any system of counting in a constant ratio has the algebraic property of multiplicative closure (a fraction of a fraction, or a multiple of a fraction is a quantity in the system), the decimal ratios as the predominant counting ratios in most human societies. Naturally, a decimal radix became the ratio between unit sizes of the metric system.

Prefixes for multiples and submultiples 

In the metric system, multiples and submultiples of units follow a decimal pattern.

A common set of decimal-based prefixes that have the effect of multiplication or division by an integer power of ten can be applied to units that are themselves too large or too small for practical use. The concept of using consistent classical (Latin or Greek) names for the prefixes was first proposed in a report by the French Revolutionary Commission on Weights and Measures in May 1793. The prefix kilo, for example, is used to multiply the unit by 1000, and the prefix milli is to indicate a one-thousandth part of the unit. Thus the kilogram and kilometre are a thousand grams and metres respectively, and a milligram and millimetre are one thousandth of a gram and metre respectively. These relations can be written symbolically as:

In the early days, multipliers that were positive powers of ten were given Greek-derived prefixes such as  kilo- and mega-, and those that were negative powers of ten were given Latin-derived prefixes such as centi- and milli-. However, 1935 extensions to the prefix system did not follow this convention: the prefixes nano- and micro-, for example have Greek roots.

When applying prefixes to derived units of area and volume that are expressed in terms of units of length squared or cubed, the square and cube operators are applied to the unit of length including the prefix, as illustrated below.

Prefixes are not usually used to indicate multiples of a second greater than 1; the non-SI units of minute, hour and day are used instead. On the other hand, prefixes are used for multiples of the non-SI unit of volume, the litre (l, L) such as millilitres (ml).

Coherence 

Each variant of the metric system has a degree of coherence—the derived units are directly related to the base units without the need for intermediate conversion factors. For example, in a coherent system the units of force, energy and power are chosen so that the equations

hold without the introduction of unit conversion factors. Once a set of coherent units have been defined, other relationships in physics that use those units will automatically be true. Therefore, Einstein's mass–energy equation, does not require extraneous constants when expressed in coherent units.

The CGS system had two units of energy, the erg that was related to mechanics and the calorie that was related to thermal energy; so only one of them (the erg) could bear a coherent relationship to the base units. Coherence was a design aim of SI, which resulted in only one unit of energy being defined – the joule.

Rationalisation
Maxwell's equations of electromagnetism contained a factor relating to steradians, representative of the fact that electric charges and magnetic fields may be considered to emanate from a point and propagate equally in all directions, i.e. spherically. This factor appeared awkwardly in many equations of physics dealing with the dimensionality of electromagnetism and sometimes other things.

Common metric systems 
A number of different metric system have been developed, all using the Mètre des Archives and Kilogramme des Archives (or their descendants) as their base units, but differing in the definitions of the various derived units.

Gaussian second and the first mechanical system of units

In 1832, Gauss used the astronomical second as a base unit in defining the gravitation of the earth, and together with the gram and millimetre, became the first system of mechanical units.

Centimetre–gram–second systems 

The centimetre–gram–second system of units (CGS) was the first coherent metric system, having been developed in the 1860s and promoted by Maxwell and Thomson. In 1874, this system was formally promoted by the British Association for the Advancement of Science (BAAS). Thermal energy was defined in calories, one calorie being the energy required to raise the temperature of one gram of water from 15.5 °C to 16.5 °C. The meeting also recognised two sets of units for electrical and magnetic properties – the electrostatic set of units and the electromagnetic set of units.

The EMU, ESU and Gaussian systems of electrical units
Several systems of electrical units were defined following discovery of Ohm's law in 1824.

International System of Electrical and Magnetic Units

The CGS units of electricity were cumbersome to work with. This was remedied at the 1893 International Electrical Congress held in Chicago by defining the "international" ampere and ohm using definitions based on the metre, kilogram and second.

Other early electromagnetic systems of units

During the same period in which the CGS system was being extended to include electromagnetism, other systems were developed, distinguished by their choice of coherent base unit, including the Practical System of Electric Units, or QES (quad–eleventhgram–second) system, was being used. These were chosen so that the corresponding electrical units of potential difference, current and resistance had a convenient magnitude.

MKS and MKSA systems 
In 1901, Giovanni Giorgi showed that by adding an electrical unit as a fourth base unit, the various anomalies in electromagnetic systems could be resolved. The metre–kilogram–second–coulomb (MKSC) and metre–kilogram–second–ampere (MKSA) systems are examples of such systems.

The International System of Units (Système international d'unités or SI) is the current international standard metric system and is also the system most widely used around the world. It is an extension of Giorgi's MKSA system – its base units are the metre, kilogram, second, ampere, kelvin, candela and mole.
The MKS (metre–kilogram–second) system came into existence in 1889, when artefacts for the metre and kilogram were fabricated according to the Metre Convention.  Early in the 20th century, an unspecified electrical unit was added, and the system was called MKSX.  When it became apparent that the unit would be the ampere, the system was referred to as the MKSA system, and was the direct predecessor of the SI.

Metre–tonne–second systems 

The metre–tonne–second system of units (MTS) was based on the metre, tonne and second – the unit of force was the sthène and the unit of pressure was the pièze. It was invented in France for industrial use and from 1933 to 1955 was used both in France and in the Soviet Union.

Gravitational systems 

Gravitational metric systems use the kilogram-force (kilopond) as a base unit of force, with mass measured in a unit known as the hyl, Technische Masseneinheit (TME), mug or metric slug. Although the CGPM passed a resolution in 1901 defining the standard value of acceleration due to gravity to be 980.665 cm/s2, gravitational units are not part of the International System of Units (SI).

International System of Units 

The International System of Units is the modern metric system. It is based on the metre–kilogram–second–ampere (MKSA) system of units from early in the 20th century. It also includes numerous coherent derived units for common quantities like power (watt) and irradience (lumen). Electrical units were taken from the International system then in use.  Other units like those for energy (joule) were modelled on those from the older CGS system, but scaled to be coherent with MKSA units. Two additional base units – the kelvin, which is equivalent to degree Celsius for change in thermodynamic temperature but set so that 0 K is absolute zero, and the candela, which is roughly equivalent to the international candle unit of illumination – were introduced. Later, another base unit, the mole, a unit of amount of substance equivalent to the Avogadro number number of specified molecules, was added along with several other derived units.

The system was promulgated by the General Conference on Weights and Measures (French: Conférence générale des poids et mesures – CGPM) in 1960.  At that time, the metre was redefined in terms of the wavelength of a spectral line of the krypton-86 atom, and the standard metre artefact from 1889 was retired.

Today, the International system of units consists of 7 base units and innumerable coherent derived units including 22 with special names. The last new derived unit, the katal for catalytic activity, was added in 1999. All the base units except the second are now defined in terms of exact and invariant constants of physics or mathematics, barring those parts of their definitions which are dependent on the second itself. The kilogram was defined by a cylinder of platinum-iridium alloy until a new definition in terms of  natural physical constants was adopted in 2019. As of 2022, the range of decimal prefixes has been extended to those for 1030 (quetta–) and 10−30 (quecto–).

The International System of Units has been adopted as the official system of weights and measures by all nations in the world except for Myanmar, Liberia, and the United States. In the United States, the Metric Conversion Act of 1975 declared the metric system to be the "preferred system of weights and measures" but did not suspend use of customary units, and the United States is the only industrialised country where commercial and standards activities do not predominantly use the metric system.

See also 
 Binary prefix, used in computer science
 Electrostatic units
 History of measurement
 ISO/IEC 80000, international standard of quantities and their units, superseding ISO 31
 List of metric units
 Metrology
 Unified Code for Units of Measure
International System of Units

Notes

References

External links 

 
International System of Units
French inventions